Khuran or Khvoran may refer to:
 Khvoran, in Alborz Province
 Khuran-e Olya, in Ilam Province
 Khuran-e Sofla, in Ilam Province
 Khvoran, Kermanshah
 Clarence Strait (Iran)